Visitors to Nicaragua must obtain a visa from one of the Nicaraguan diplomatic missions unless they come from one of the visa exempt countries or countries that can obtain a visa on arrival. All visitors must hold a passport valid for 6 months.

Visa policy map

Visa exemption 
Holders of passports of the following 90(+1) jurisdictions can visit Nicaragua without a visa for up to 90 days
(all visitors must hold proof of sufficient funds to cover their stay and documents required for next destination):

ID - May also enter with an ID card if come from a country that is part of the CA-4 Agreement.

Visa is not required for a maximum stay of 90 days within 180 days for valid visa holders or residents of Canada, the European Union member states, or the United States. This does not apply to nationals of China and Iran.

Holders of diplomatic, official or service passports of Bolivia, Colombia, China, Dominica, Egypt, Grenada, Guyana, India, Jamaica, Kenya, Montenegro, Morocco, Papua New Guinea, Peru, Philippines, Serbia, Suriname and Thailand do not require a visa.

Visa on arrival
Citizens of the following 74 countries and territories can visit Nicaragua by obtaining a visa on arrival:

Substitute visas
Nationals of  Afghanistan, Albania, Armenia, Bangladesh, Bosnia and Herzegovina, Botswana, Republic of the Congo, Democratic Republic of the Congo, Eritrea, Iraq, Laos, Liberia, Libya, Mali, Mongolia, Nepal, Nigeria, Sierra Leone, Somalia, Sri Lanka, Sudan, Syria, Timor-Leste, and Yemen or ordinary passport holders issued by Cameroon, Haiti, India, Kenya, Pakistan, and Vietnam are granted a visa on arrival for US$50 provided the passport contains a credible US, Canada or Schengen visa.

Transit
Transit without a visa is allowed for travellers who normally require a visa but are transiting within 24 hours and hold onward tickets.  This does not apply to nationals of Afghanistan, Albania, Armenia, Bangladesh, Bosnia and Herzegovina, Botswana, Cameroon,  China, Republic of the Congo, Democratic Republic of the Congo, Cuba, Eritrea, Haiti, India, Iraq, Kenya, Laos, Lebanon, Liberia, Mali, Mongolia, Nepal, Nigeria, Pakistan, Sierra Leone, Somalia, Sri Lanka, Sudan, Syria, Timor-Leste, Vietnam and Yemen.

Tourist card

Nationals from all visa-exempt countries are required to obtain a tourist card (US$10) on arrival. Exempt are the citizens of El Salvador, Guatemala, and Honduras, as well as holders of diplomatic, official, service or special passports issued to any country.

Central America-4 Border Control Agreement 
The Central America-4 Border Control Agreement is a treaty between Guatemala, El Salvador, Honduras and Nicaragua. A visa issued by one of the four countries is honored by all four of the countries. The time period for the visa, however, applies to the total time spent in any of the four countries without leaving the CA-4 area.

Visitor statistics
Most visitors arriving to Nicaragua were from the following countries of nationality:

See also

Central America-4 Border Control Agreement
Visa requirements for Nicaraguan citizens

References

Nicaragua
Foreign relations of Nicaragua